X̣ (minuscule: x̣) is a letter of the Latin alphabet, taken from an X with a dot below the letter. It is hard to render in computers because it is not used in the most common languages. It is used in the Livonian language and in Chinook Jargon (Chinuk Wawa).

References

Latin letters with diacritics
Phonetic transcription symbols